Shahin Tehran Football Club ( meaning Falcon), also spelled Shaahin or Shaheen, from 1973 to 1979 known as Shahbaz (meaning Shahbaz),
is an Iranian football club based in Tehran, Iran. Shahin A.C. is located at East of Tehran in the Narmak neighborhood (Golestan Street). Shahin was the most popular clubs in Iran before the 1960s and it had a rivalry with Taj Tehran. Their match was the most important derby of Iran at the time. Shahin F.C. was dissolved in 1967 for political reasons. The club was revived again after the Iranian Revolution in 1979. Due to the Iran–Iraq War, the national league was not held during the 1980s, however, Shahin was one of the strongest teams in the provincial league of Tehran.

They currently compete in the Tehran provincial league.

History

In June 1942, Dr. Abbas Ekrami opened the poetry book Divan-e Hafez and saw the following line about Shahin (Falcon), after which he named the club Shahin,

Ekrami founded the club with help of some young students under the motto:

Shahin became a prominent club in Iran and formed other teams for its sub-clubs Oghab F.C., Shahbaz F.C., Darius F.Cc, Simorgh FC, Atom FC, and Pirooz FC. The club produced many famous Iranian players such as Masoud Boroumand, Homayoun Behzadi and Mehrab Shahrokhi.

Shahin FC, without any doubt was the most popular football club in the history of Iranian football. Shahin produced many talented players like Parviz Dehdari, Masoud Boroumand, Homayoun Behzadi, Jafar Kashani, Hossein Kalani, Hamid Shirzadegan, Iraj Saeli, Mahmoud Sajjadi, Mohammad Hossein Ziaei, Ghasem Movafegh and many more that played for Team Melli. These talents made Shahin popular in the 1960s but its very popularity was viewed as a threat by the Iran Football Federation and the Keihan Varzeshi newspaper (Iran's most important sports publication at the time). The conflict between them became worse and on July 9, 1967, two days after Shahin's 3–0 win against Tehranjavan F.C., the Iran Sports Organization declared Shahin F.C. as dissolved. League attendance dropped and other clubs including Pas Tehran, Rah Ahan, and Oghab tried to sign Shahin players.

Despite the efforts to sign and disperse Shahin players to various clubs, Parviz Dehdari, newly appointed manager of Persepolis F.C., and Masoud Boroumand persuaded most Shahin players to join Persepolis and granted the popularity of Shahin to Persepolis.

Shahbaz Era
In 1973 Shahin F.C. decided to come back but returned with the name of its former third team Shahbaz F.C. and participated in Takht Jamshid Cup professional soccer League. Shahbaz F.C. was leading the league in the 1978–1979 season which was unfinished due to Iranian Revolution in 1979. After the revolution, the club reverted to its original name, "Shahin", and was one of the top teams of in Iranian football during the 1980s.

In 2009/10 Shahin was competing in the third ranked 2nd Division successfully until the last stage, when they failed to be promoted to the Azadegan 1st Division. In 2010/11 Shahin kept its place in the 3rd Division.

In 2011/12 Shahin finished last in its group and therefore is relegated to the provincial league for 2012/13.

Branches and affiliated clubs
Shahin F.C. had several attached teams and branches under the name and license of Shahin F.C. in different cities of Iran, including Shahin Bushehr F.C. (est. 1942), Shahin Ahvaz F.C. (est. 1948) and Shahin Isfahan F.C.(est. 1953). In 1967 due to the political problems that arose in the Shahin F.C. organization, the other teams were forced to cease operations as well. Some had to deactivate for a period of time, while other teams renamed and continued under different names.

Persepolis F.C. started the 1968 season with Parviz Dehdari as manager. Despite the efforts to sign and disperse Shahin players to various clubs, Parviz Dehdari and Masoud Boroumand transferred the popularity of Shahin to Persepolis F.C. by taking most Shahin Players to join Persepolis. Persepolis F.C. using four Shahin players, had a friendly match with Jam Abadan, a respected team at the time. After the match the remainder of the Shahin players joined Persepolis. Although Shahin Tehran established in a new team under the name of Shahbaz, it was failed to get back its popularity again.

Shahin Isfahan F.C. changed its name to Sepahan F.C.. The club is one of the representatives of Isfahan Province in Takht Jamshid Cup national league. The team now plays under the name of Foolad Mobarakeh Sepahan, and has been able to attain a respectable fan base in its hometown.

Shahin Bushehr is one of the most popular clubs of Iran. After years of history and competing in different levels of the Iranian football league system, including a 1994–95 appearance in the top division and several years in the second level, Shahin Bushehr was renamed Shahin Pars Jonoubi Bushehr in 2007 and promoted to IPL in 2009. The club is now owned by Pars Special Economic Energy Zone, based in Asalouyeh, Bushehr Province and currently competes in the 2nd Division after being relegated from Azadegan League in 2013.

Shahin Ahvaz F.C. was founded in 1948 and was one of Shahin Tehran F.C. branches at the time. The golden years of Shahin Ahvaz F.C. were in the 1980s when the team won its very first "Hazfi cup" after defeating Persepolis Tehran in the semi-finals and then Malavan Anzali in the final game. This win made them automatically qualify to the Asian Club Championship. They currently compete in the Provincial Leagues.

Colours and crest
The usual home kit includes a white shirt, black shorts, and white socks. The away kit of the club is commonly with a black background.

Achievements

Takht Jamshid Cup
 Third place: 1976/77
 Leader: 1978/79 (in autumn 1978 the season was canceled due to the political uprisings, which ended with the Iranian Revolution in February 1979)

Tehran Football League
 Winner (3): 1951–52,1958–59,1965–66
 Runner-up (8): 1948–49, 1949–50, 1947–48, 1949–50, 1961–62, 1963–64, 1985_86,1986_87

Tehran Hazfi Cup (Record)
 Winner (5): 1947–48, 1948–49, 1949–50, 1962–63, 1980–81
 Runner-up (3): 1952–53, 1956–57, 1957–58

Espandi Cup
 Third place: 1979
Current Exuctive Director:Alireza Kushanfar

Season-by-season

The table below chronicles the achievements of Shahin in various competitions since 1965.

Key

 P = Played
 W = Games won
 D = Games drawn
 L = Games lost
 F = Goals for
 A = Goals against
 Pts = Points
 Pos = Final position

 TJC = Takht Jamshid Cup
 TFL = Tehran Football League
 TFL2 = Tehran Football League's 2nd Div.
 Div 3 = 3rd Division

Founder and manager
  Dr. Abbas Ekrami (1942–1970)

Managers
  Shapoor Sarhadi
  Amirhoshang Nikkhah Baharami
  Jafar Kashani
  Amirhoshang Nikkhah Bahrami

World Cup players

 1978 FIFA World Cup
  Nasrollah Abdollahi
  Nasser Hejazi
  Ebrahim Ghasempour
  Hamid-Majid Tajmuri
  Majid Bishkar

References

See also
 Hazfi Cup
 Iran Football's 3rd Division 2011–12

Official
  Official club website

Football clubs in Iran
Defunct football clubs in Iran
Association football clubs established in 1942
Sport in Tehran
1942 establishments in Iran